Daryl Freame (born 28 December 1957) is a former Australian rules football player who played in the VFL between 1977 and 1981 for the Richmond Football Club.

References
Hogan P: The Tigers Of Old, Richmond FC, Melbourne 1996

External links
 
 

Living people
1957 births
Australian rules footballers from Victoria (Australia)
Richmond Football Club players
Richmond Football Club Premiership players
One-time VFL/AFL Premiership players